Yuri Petrovich Artyukhin (22 June 1930 – 4 August 1998) was a Soviet Russian cosmonaut and engineer who made a single flight into space.

Artyukhin graduated from the Soviet Air Force Institute with a doctorate in engineering, specializing in military communication systems. He was selected for the space programme in 1963 and would have flown on the Voskhod 3 mission had it not been canceled. He made his single flight on Soyuz 14 in 1974, where his area of expertise was presumably put to good use.

He left the space programme in 1982 and held various positions in space-related fields. Most notably, he was involved in the development of the Soviet space shuttle Buran and in cosmonaut training.

He died of cancer on 4 August 1998.

He was awarded:
Hero of the Soviet Union
Pilot-Cosmonaut of the USSR
Order of Lenin
Order of the Red Star
Medal "For Distinction in Guarding the State Border of the USSR"
Jan Krasicki Cross (Poland)

References 

1930 births
1998 deaths
People from Klinsky District
Soviet cosmonauts
Heroes of the Soviet Union
Deaths from cancer in Russia
Recipients of the Medal "For Distinction in Guarding the State Border of the USSR"
Salyut program cosmonauts